Ion Barbu (1895–1961) was a Romanian mathematician and poet.

Ion Barbu may also refer to:

Ion Barbu (athlete) (born 1930), Romanian Olympic racewalker
Ion Barbu (footballer born 1938) (1938–2011), Romanian football defender 
Ion Barbu (footballer born 1977), Romanian football defender